A car elevator or vehicle elevator is an elevator designed for the vertical transportation of vehicles inside buildings, so increasing the number of vehicles that can be parked in parking lots and parking garages. Where real estate is costly, these car parking systems can reduce overall costs by using less land to park the same number of cars. 

Vehicle lifts, which lift a car at its center of gravity, are used in garages and repair shops and are designed to allow access to a car's undercarriage for repair.

Examples
American politician and former presidential candidate Mitt Romney included a car elevator in his 2008 proposal for rebuilding his beach house in La Jolla, San Diego. The elevator is intended to transport cars between floors in a planned split-level, four-vehicle garage. Romney received final approval for the project in October 2013, after an appeal against San Diego's approval of the project was dismissed.

The Porsche Design Tower, a high-rise residential building with 132 units in Sunny Isles Beach, Florida, contains three car elevators. The elevators, named "Dezervators" after building developer Gil Dezer, transport cars up to parking spaces directly connected to each apartment unit. The elevators are in circular glass structures and rotate to align with the correct car parking space, allowing residents to exit directly from their cars to their apartments. The building opened in 2017.

The Boring Company, a company owned by entrepreneur Elon Musk, built a prototype car elevator in 2017. In 2018, the company received permission from the Hawthorne, California city council to construct a car elevator designed to connect an above-ground garage to the Boring Test Tunnel, an underground test tunnel. The Boring Company intends to use the test tunnel and elevator for research and development of a proposed underground Hyperloop system designed to solve traffic congestion in Los Angeles.

See also
 Automated parking system
 Car parking system
 Car ramp

References

External links
 

Elevators
Automotive technologies